Hugo Horacio Lóndero Secullini (born 18 September 1946) is an Argentine-born Colombian retired footballer. He is the third top goalscorer of the Colombian Primera A with 211 goals. He played for Colombia at 1975 Copa América, and scored one goal in an unofficial match against Brazil.

Honours

Club
América de Cali
Categoría Primera A top goalscorer (1): 1969

Atlético Nacional
Categoría Primera A (2): 1973, 1976

Cúcuta Deportivo
Categoría Primera A top goalscorer (2): 1971, 1972

References

External links
 

1946 births
Living people
Colombian footballers
Colombia international footballers
Argentine footballers
Atlético Nacional footballers
América de Cali footballers
Independiente Medellín footballers
Argentine emigrants to Colombia
Expatriate footballers in Argentina
Expatriate footballers in Colombia
Argentine expatriate sportspeople in Colombia
Naturalized citizens of Colombia
Club de Gimnasia y Esgrima La Plata footballers
Cúcuta Deportivo footballers
Deportivo Pereira footballers
Categoría Primera A players
Association football forwards